Georges Creek is a stream in the U.S. state of West Virginia. It is a tributary of the Kanawha River.

Georges Creek was named after George Alderson, a local judge.

See also
List of rivers of West Virginia

References

Rivers of Kanawha County, West Virginia
Rivers of West Virginia